Abram Creek is a  tributary stream of the North Branch Potomac River in Grant and Mineral counties in West Virginia's Eastern Panhandle.

Variant names
In 1895, the Board on Geographic Names officially decided upon Abram Creek as the stream's name. According to the Geographic Names Information System, Abram Creek has been known by the following names:

Abraham Creek
Abrahams Creek 	
Abram's Creek 	
Abrams Creek

Course
Abram Creek rises on the North Fork Lunice Creek divide about 0.1 miles south-southeast of Bismarck, West Virginia. Tributaries to Abram Creek include Laurel Run, Glade Run, Johnnycake Run, and Emory Creek. Abram Creek enters the North Branch Potomac River at Harrison, West Virginia, across from Shallmar, Maryland.

Watershed
Abram Creek drains  of area, receives about 43.2 in/year of precipitation, has a topographic wetness index of 410.24 and is about 75.9% forested.

See also
List of West Virginia rivers

Maps

References

Tributaries of the Potomac River
Rivers of Grant County, West Virginia
Rivers of Mineral County, West Virginia
Rivers of West Virginia